A bokor  (male) ) or caplata (female) is a Vodou witch for hire who is said to serve the loa "with both hands", practicing for both good and evil. Their practice includes the creation of zombies and of 'ouangas', talismans that house spirits.

The term bokor can also refer to the leader of the Makaya division of Vodou, which originated in the Congo region. It is believed  that there is a grand master for all bokors that have ever lived who can be reborn in every century.

Description
Bokors, featured in many Haitian tales, are often associated with the creation of "zombies" by the use of a deadening brew or potion, usually containing poison extracted from puffer fish (tetrodotoxin). This potion induces the drinker to appear as though they were dead; thus they are often buried. Later, the bokor would return for the "corpse" and force it to do his bidding, such as manual labor. The "corpse" is often given deliriant drugs, mainly datura stramonium, where they enter a detached, somewhat dreamlike state. Its state is likened to being mind controlled. The person is alive but in a state where they cannot control what they say or do; at this point, when the person has been "reanimated" from the grave, or at least is moving about working for the bokor, they can be termed "zombies." However, some legends dispense with this explanation, and have the bokor raise zombies from dead bodies whose souls have departed. 

Also, bokors are said to work with zombie astrals – souls or spirits which are captured in a fetish and made to enhance the Bokor's power. Bokors normally work with the Loas Baron Samedi, Kalfu, Legba and Simbi (snake loa), and in some cases they are said to work with Grand Bois, the loa of the forest.

Bokors are similar to the "root workers" of Vodou and New Orleans voodoo. Some may be priests of a Vodou house. Bokor are usually chosen from birth, those who are believed to bear a great ashe (power). A bokor can be, by worldly terms, good or evil, though some sources consider them an evil version of a houngan.

See also
Abakuá, an Afro-Cuban religion whose name possibly shares the same etymology
Clairvius Narcisse, a Haitian alleged to have been kept in a zombie-like state by a bokor

References

Haitian Vodou